The Cimarron Bend Wind Farm is a 599 megawatt (MW) wind farm spanning northwest Clark County in the U.S. state of Kansas.   It became the second largest wind generating facility in the state upon completion of the first two construction phases in early 2017.  The facility allowed the Kansas City Board of Public Utilities (BPU) to obtain more than 45% of its electricity needs from renewable sources.

Details
The project was developed by the Kansas-based firm Tradewind Energy, which previously built a strategic partnership with the Italian-controlled firm Enel Green Power North America (EGPNA) that resulted in the construction of several wind farms throughout the state, including the Smoky Hills Wind Farm.    The electricity and tax credits from the first 200 MW phase are contracted with Google Inc.,  and those from the second 200 MW phase are contracted with the Kansas City BPU.    A third 200 MW phase was also planned for development.

The facility's first two phases span about 60,000 acres of farm and grazing land in the southwest region of the state near the town of Minneola.  It includes 200 Vestas V110-2.0 MW wind turbines for which many components were manufactured in Colorado.   Construction of the facility started in April 2016 and employed about 350 local workers.   Phase I was completed year end 2016 and phase II in late March 2017.   The ongoing operation and maintenance activities employ about 15 people.

Construction was financed by Enel Green Power North America Renewable Energy Partners, an equally owned joint venture between EGPNA and GE Capital’s Energy Financial Services.   EGPNA obtained further investor financing through tax equity agreements with other U.S. financial institutions including Bank of America, Merrill Lynch, J.P. Morgan Chase, and MetLife.

In early 2019,  EGPNA acquired Tradewind Energy and its portfolio of future projects under development.  It also purchased GE's interest in their joint venture facilities,  including the operating Cimmaron Bend Wind Farm.

The facility was expanded to 599 MW in 2020, making it EGPNA's largest US wind farm.

Electricity production 

(*)   partial year of operation
(NR)  not yet reported

See also

Wind power in Kansas
List of wind farms in the United States

References

Energy infrastructure completed in 2017
Wind farms in Kansas
Buildings and structures in Clark County, Kansas